John H. Swift (August 29, 1840 – December 14, 1911) was an Irish-American manufacturer and politician from New York.

Life 
Swift was born on August 29, 1840 in Ireland, the son of Peter Swift and Katharine Monahan. He immigrated to America in 1845.

Swift initially lived in Poquonock, Connecticut and attended public schools there. While serving as an apprentice to a carriage manufacturer, he enlisted in Company A, 12th Connecticut Volunteers. He served with them for three years during the American Civil War, participating in several major battles under Generals Benjamin Butler, Nathaniel P. Banks, and Philip Sheridan. Following his discharge, he learned the blacksmith trade and began working as a skilled mechanic for a large forging company in Southington, Connecticut. In 1883, he formed a manufacturing company called the Union Carriage and Forging Company in Union, New York with fellow factory workmen with Le Roy S. White and George D. Lincoln.  In 1899, they incorporated the Union Forging Company, with Swift as its vice-president.

Swift was a Republican all his life, casting his first presidential vote for Abraham Lincoln on a Virginia battlefield. He served as trustee and president of the village of Union for four years. In 1899, he was elected to the New York State Assembly as a Republican, representing the Broome County 2nd District. He served in the Assembly in 1900 and 1901.

Swift was an active member of the Grand Army of the Republic. In 1868, he married Norah Carroll of Winsted, Connecticut. Their children were James C., Ellen A., Lillian C., and John P.

Swift died at home on December 14, 1911. He was buried in St. Patrick's Cemetery.

References

External links 

 The Political Graveyard

1840 births
1911 deaths
Irish emigrants to the United States (before 1923)
People from Windsor, Connecticut
People of Connecticut in the American Civil War
People from Southington, Connecticut
People from Broome County, New York
American manufacturing businesspeople
19th-century American politicians
20th-century American politicians
Republican Party members of the New York State Assembly
Burials in New York (state)